Luma macropsalis is a moth in the family Crambidae. It was described by George Hampson in 1897. It is found on New Guinea, where it has been recorded from Fergusson Island.

References

Moths described in 1897
Spilomelinae